Innovation Square, formerly Xerox Tower, is a skyscraper in downtown Rochester, New York, standing at  tall. The tower is the centerpiece of a roughly  complex named Xerox Square. When it was built in 1967, it was the tallest building made of poured-in-place exposed aggregate concrete. It is the tallest building in Rochester, as well as the third tallest building in New York outside of New York City. It was initially used as the headquarters of Xerox Corporation.

The "Digital X" Xerox logo at the top of the building was removed in 2005 with Xerox's new positioning away from "The Document Company" signature and the related logo in use since 1994.

On April 18, 2009, Xerox announced their wish to sell the tower and other buildings in Xerox Square, and lease back the office space. In August 2013 the property was sold to Buckingham Properties for $40 million.  Under the terms of the sale Xerox will continue to lease space in the building for eight years, with an option to renew. Between the Summer and Autumn of 2015, a multi-color light display was added to all four corners of the tower roof.

The complex formerly featured an outdoor skating rink, and an English pub-style restaurant called The Shakespeare, both of which operated until the late 1970s or 1980s before being converted to a private outdoor lounge for Xerox employees.

On January 26, 2018, Xerox has announced that it would vacate the entire building to move all its local employees to Webster.

More recently, it was sold to Gallina Development. Gallina announced that it would rename the complex "Innovation Square" and retrofit it with housing, commercial, and college student living space. The auditorium, which was kept, reopened as a performing arts center in September 2021.

Gallery

References

External links
Xerox Tower, Emporis
Xerox Tower, Skyscraperpage
Xerox Tower, RochesterDowntown

Office buildings completed in 1968
Skyscraper office buildings in Rochester, New York
Welton Becket buildings
Xerox